Cirazoline is a full agonist at the α1A adrenergic receptor, a partial agonist at both the α1B and α1D adrenergic receptors, and a nonselective antagonist to the α2 adrenergic receptor. It is believed that this combination of properties could make cirazoline an effective vasoconstricting agent.

Cirazoline has also been shown to decrease food intake in rats, purportedly through activation of α1 adrenoceptors in the paraventricular nucleus in the hypothalamus of the brain. Administration of cirazoline also seemed to present impairment in the spatial memory of monkeys through the activation of the same receptors that showed decreased food intake in rats. However, in preliminary studies, through stimulation of α2 adrenoceptors, working memory is comparatively improved.

References

Alpha-1 adrenergic receptor agonists
Alpha-2 blockers
Cyclopropyl compounds
Imidazolines
Phenol ethers